Ytstenut Peak is the northeasternmost peak in the Borg Massif, in Queen Maud Land. Mapped by Norwegian cartographers from surveys and air photos by the Norwegian-British-Swedish Antarctic Expedition (NBSAE) (1949–1952), led by John Schjelderup Giæver and air photos by the Norwegian expedition (1958–59) and named Ytstenut (outermost peak).

Mountains of Queen Maud Land
Princess Martha Coast